The Searchers is an Iranian TV series broadcast in 2009. It is written and directed by Mohammad Ali Sadjadi. The theme of the series is about two Inspectors from Iran's General inspection Organization (Persian:سازمان بازرسی کل کشور) searching for economic crimes and corruptions among Iranian corporations and manufacturers. The series is produced episodically. It is on Iranian TV every Wednesday.

The cast
Masoud Rayegan as Inspector Ata Bahrami. The main character of the series, an experienced inspector at the organization that solves financial crime files. He usually smokes and is of Lori origin.
Payam Dehkordi as Inspector Majid Moghaddam. A former police officer of the Mazandarani origin. His character is a person too much interested in eating while working. He's Ata Bahrami's assistant.
Masoumeh Mir-Hosseini as Pari Shakeri - A specialist working in organization for Signature and handwriting recognition. She sometimes receives some inspirations, e.g. in episode 6 she was inspired the bad happening to Maj. Rahimi.
Reza Babak as Ebadi

Guest actors
Reza Kianian as Haji AbediZadeh (in episode 5)
Pantea Bahram as Mrs. Soodabeh Fazli (in episode 6)- The secretary of Mr. Sabeti.
Reza Fayazi

References

Iranian television series
2009 Iranian television series debuts
2000s Iranian television series
2010s Iranian television series
Islamic Republic of Iran Broadcasting original programming
Persian-language television shows